Baseodiscidae is a family of worms belonging to the order Heteronemertea.

Genera:
 Baseodiscus
 Oxypolia Punnett, 1901

References

Heteronemertea
Nemertea families